Marvin's Maze is a maze game released by SNK for arcades in 1983.

Plot

Marvin's Maze is a maze game where the player fight against Robonoids while trying to clear the maze of dots. There are two ways to finish each rack: eating up all the dots, or destroying a certain number of Robonoids (listed at the bottom of the screen). Two ways to destroy the Robonoids: shoot them, or remove the ground from under them at certain points of the maze (the 'Trick').

Scoring
1 Robonoid: 500 
2 Robonoids: 1500 
3 Robonoids: 3500 
4 Robonoids: 7500 
5 Robonoids: 15500 
Dot: 100 
Super Dot: 200 
Trick (remove ground from under Robonoid): 500 
Bonus at end of round: 500 X number of Robonoids destroyed

References

1983 video games
Arcade video games
Maze games
SNK games
SNK Playmore games
PlayStation Network games
Video games developed in Japan